Leucanopsis obvia is a moth of the family Erebidae. It was described by Paul Dognin in 1909. It is found in French Guiana, Suriname, Brazil, Venezuela, Ecuador and Peru.

References

 

obvia
Moths described in 1909